Brian Gottfried and Raúl Ramírez were the defending champions but did not compete that year.

Ismail El Shafei and Brian Fairlie won in the final 4–6, 6–4, 7–6 against Syd Ball and Kim Warwick.

Seeds

Draw

Finals

Top half

Bottom half

External links
1976 Custom Credit Australian Indoor Championships Doubles Draw

Doubles